Poriferastane or 24S-ethylcholestane is a tetracyclic triterpene and the parent structure of a series of steroids, such as poriferastanol.

See also
 Stigmastane (24R-ethylcholestane)
 Campestane (24R-methylcholestane)
 Ergostane (24S-methylcholestane)

References

Triterpenes